The Women's road time trial T1-2 road cycling event at the 2016 Summer Paralympics took place on the afternoon of 14 September at Flamengo Park, Pontal. 7 riders competed over one lap of a fifteen kilometre course.

The T1 category is for cyclists with significant balance issues. The T2 category is for cyclists with moderate balance issues. In both categories, tricycles are used.

Results
Women's road time trial T1-2. 14 September 2016, Rio.

References

Women's road time trial T1-2